The Iris Festival is the annual and official celebration of the Brussels-Capital Region in Belgium. This takes place on May 8.

It is a day off for Brussels officials.

The date of May 8 was chosen for three reasons:

 It takes place during the flowering period of the iris—also called flower of Lys—which is the symbol of the region and is pictured at its flag.
 It is the day of the victory against Nazi Germany during World War II.
 It is also one of the feasts of Saint Michael the Archangel, patron saint of Brussels.

During the multi-day party, free concerts, street entertainment and all kinds of activities are organized for the general public. Some monuments are exceptionally accessible to the public, and a food truck festival takes place on this day.

In 2008, there were 100,000 participants at the festivities.

Since 2015, Rock Around The Atomium has also been organized at the Atomium in this weekend.

See also
 Day of the Flemish Community
 French Community Holiday
 Day of the Walloon Region
 Day of the German-speaking Community
 Belgian National Day

References

External links
 Official website irisfestival.brussels

Year of establishment missing
Public holidays in Belgium
Culture in Brussels
May observances